Artie Kane (born Aaron Cohen; April 14, 1929 – June 21, 2022)  was an American pianist, film score composer, and conductor with a career spanning over six decades.

As a pianist in Hollywood studios, Kane worked with artists such as Frank Sinatra, Henry Mancini, John Williams, and Quincy Jones.

He composed the music for over 250 television shows. Some of his works for television include Wonder Woman, Vegas, Hotel, Dynasty, Matlock, A Question of Guilt, and Man Against the Mob. Kane also composed the film scores for five motion pictures including The Bat People, Looking for Mr. Goodbar, Eyes of Laura Mars, Night of the Juggler, and Wrong Is Right.

During his career, he conducted on over 60 motion pictures at MGM, Disney, Universal, Fox, Warner Brothers, Sony, Columbia Pictures, and Paramount.

In 1976, Kane was nominated for a Grammy Award along with Ralph Grierson for a two-piano George Gershwin Album, S Wonderful on Angel Records. He was inducted into the Columbus Senior Musicians Hall of Fame in 1998 and is a co-author of the book, Music to My Years: Love and Life Between the Notes.

Biography

Early life

Kane was born in Columbus, Ohio in 1929. His family was Jewish. His mother, Sarah Berman, emigrated from Belarus in 1914. His father, Nathan Cohen, whose family members were Russian musicians, immigrated to the United States from Russia. Nathan served two years in the U.S. Army in France during WWI. Kane's parents married in 1924 in Columbus. Kane's father died a week before his third birthday. He was raised by his mother and uncle, Joe Berman, whom Kane credited for inspiring him to become a musician.

Kane took to the piano at the age of three and was considered a child prodigy. At four, he won first prize in a statewide contest, competing with children of seven and eight. At 10, he studied under Agnes Wright and went to New York once a year to play for Prof. Alexander Siloti, Rachmaninoff's teacher who advised Kane as to his next season's study.

In 1938, Kane won a scholarship to The Columbus Boychoir School where he first sang alto, and within a year became an accompanist and featured performer until 1947. He later studied piano at the Cincinnati Conservatory of Music. In 1943, after a performance at Town Hall in New York City, he received a scholarship to study classical piano with Djane Lavoie-Herz in Manhattan.

In 1944, Kane returned to Columbus and attended South High School, played in Snook Neal's band and was hired by radio station WBNS where he played daily radio segments of classical piano, plus his own arrangements of popular music.

In 1947 at eighteen years old, he was hired as a pianist in the band at Club Gloria in Columbus, Ohio with comedian Harry Jarkey. From the radio work and write-ups in local newspapers, the conductor Izler Solomon invited Kane to play Gershwin's Rhapsody in Blue for a Pops concert with the Columbus Philharmonic Orchestra.

On October 19, 1948, Kane changed his name from Aaron Cohen to Artie Kane on the advice of Matt Gilbert, a cartoonist for The Cleveland Plain Dealer who suggested it as a more distinctive stage name. His mother Sarah Cohen also changed her name from Sarah B. Cohen to Sally B. Kane.

Holiday on Ice
In 1949, Artie Kane went to Toledo, Ohio, to audition as pianist for Holiday On Ice and was hired based on his reputation. He spent eight years on the road as rehearsal pianist and pianist/conductor for the company.

From 1953 to 1956, Kane was the rehearsal and show pianist for Norwegian figure skater and Olympic medalist Sonja Henie during the European Holiday On Ice Tour. He also appeared in NBC's first color television spectacular, Sonja Henie’s Holiday on Ice on December 22, 1956.

New York

In 1956, Kane left the ice show and went to New York City working as a Broadway rehearsal and audition pianist and playing nightclubs. He was hired as pianist and assistant conductor at the Roxy Theatre, for the Roxy Orchestra under conductor Robert Boucher, playing and conducting four shows a day, seven days a week for two years. His work is included on the Bob Boucher's orchestra LP record Sightseeing in Sound with a solo opening of ragtime piano.

Prior to the Roxy's closing, Kane was offered a job as Jaye P. Morgan's on-the-road conductor and pianist. Kane conducted for her in night clubs, at personal appearances, and recording sessions and they lived together in the Upper East Side of New York City.

Hollywood

Kane and Morgan married on July 31, 1960, and they settled in Los Angeles. In Hollywood, he renewed an acquaintance with Dominic Frontiere, a composer in LA whom he had met in New York. Frontiere, in turn, opened doors for him to join the musicians' Local 47 and hired him to play for the TV series The New Breed.<ref>{{cite news|last1=Burlingame|first1=Jon|title=Dominic Frontiere, Composer for 'The Outer Limits,' 'The Flying Nun, Dies at 86|url=https://variety.com/2017/music/news/dominic-frontiere-dead-dies-composer-outer-limits-1202648539/|work=Variety|date=24 December 2017}}</ref> Frontiere also hired Kane throughout the sixties as he composed music for producer Leslie Stevens’ weekly television shows, including Outer Limits and Quinn Martin Productions’ The Fugitive.

Session Keyboardist

In 1960, Frontiere introduced Kane to a contractor at MGM, who was looking for a pianist to work at that studio. As a pianist he worked with composers such as Alex North on the film, The Outrage (1964), Jerry Goldsmith on Planet of the Apes (1967) and The Illustrated Man (1969), Fred Karlin on Westworld (1973), Jerry Fielding on The Outfit (1973), and Elmer Bernstein on McQ (1974).

In 1966, Nelson Riddle, the arranger and conductor for Frank Sinatra's future Billboard #1 and Grammy Award-winning album Strangers in the Night, asked Kane to play the Hammond organ on the album. Nine months earlier as a studio pianist, Kane played a pop-rock organ on Nelson's score for a car-race film called Red Line 7000 and Nelson was looking for a similar sound for the Sinatra album. Eight months later in December, Kane appeared on the subsequent television special, A Man and His Music – Part II.

Between 1968 and 1969, French composer Michel Legrand hired Kane as a pianist for the films Ice Station Zebra, The Thomas Crown Affair, and The Happy Ending, directed by Richard Brooks.

In 1972, Kane was brought to RCA's attention by composer, conductor, and pianist Henry Mancini who was impressed by Kane's work with Ray Brown on bass and Shelly Manne on drums for Henry's film score, Me, Natalie. Later that year, Mancini personally produced and arranged the music for the trio called, Artie Kane Plays Organ!

In 1975, towards the end of his career as a session musician, Artie distinguished himself by joining with another respected session pianist, Ralph Grierson, to release a two-piano Gershwin album called S Wonderful. The album included rare, out-of-print and never-before-recorded songs published in the 1930s and '40s, as well as An American in Paris, Three Preludes, and six 'classic' Gershwin show tunes. The album was nominated for a Grammy in 1976.

For sixteen years Kane worked as a session keyboardist for Fox, MGM, Warner Music, and Universal on movies, television, film, and television variety shows before starting his composing career.

Composer

With twelve years of training, playing piano for film scores, Kane decided to pursue a career as a film composer. Kane studied with teachers Mario Castelnuovo-Tedesco, a faculty member and teacher of film music at the Los Angeles Conservatory of Music and Dr. Albert Harris. Harris helped Kane refine his skills and in 1974, Kane was given a chance to compose and orchestrate the music for a horror film known by several titles: It Lives by Night, The Bat People, and It’s Alive.

In 1977, when composer Dave Grusin was unavailable for Richard Brooks' film, Looking for Mr. Goodbar, Alan Bergman, the lyricist, suggested Kane compose the score for the Academy Award nominated film starring Diane Keaton and Richard Gere.

In 1978, Columbia Pictures offered Kane the film Eyes of Laura Mars, a Faye Dunaway and Tommy Lee Jones thriller. It was the first film for producer Jon Peters. Kane composed and conducted the score and worked with Barbra Streisand who performed the hit love theme from the movie, Prisoner.

When producer Douglas S. Cramer became head of production at Spelling Productions, he took Kane with him. Kane rotated with other composers scoring Love Boat and Vegas for the Spelling lineup. While working on his first Love Boat assignment, Kane heard from a producer at Lorimar about scoring a movie-for-television directed by Robert Butler and starring Tuesday Weld titled A Question of Guilt in 1978.

In 1980, when Kane finished scoring an action thriller film called, Night of the Juggler for Columbia Pictures, Richard Brooks, the director Kane worked for on Looking for Mr. Goodbar, asked him to score his new film, the comedy thriller Wrong is Right starring Katharine Ross and Sean Connery.

In 1987, after scoring a few episodes of crime drama Jake and the Fatman, Kane became one of a rotating group of composers on a popular spinoff show called Matlock, starring Andy Griffith. Kane composed 56 episodes of the series over six years and won four BMI TV Music Awards for his work.

Between 1976 1990, Kane's television credits include the music for 31 episodes of the action series, Wonder Woman,  56 episodes of the sitcom Love Boat, 18 episodes of the soap opera Dynasty, ten episodes of the detective series Vega$, and 11 episodes of crime drama Wolf. His credits also include three two-hour Gunsmoke television movies, Gunsmoke: To the Last Man (1992), Gunsmoke: The Long Ride (1993), and Gunsmoke: One Man's Justice.

Conductor

In 1992, Kane received a surprise offer to conduct for composer Marc Shaiman on his scores for the films A Few Good Men and Sister Act which launched his third career as a conductor.

One of Kane's more memorable experiences as a conductor was in March 1993. He received a phone call from the conductor John Williams to stand in for him for a few sessions as conductor for the Steven Spielberg film, Jurassic Park. With little preparation and with Kane's friend and Williams' music editor Ken Wannberg, Kane sight-read the score and recorded it with a 106-piece orchestra.

Kane conducted more than sixty film scores for composers such as Marc Shaiman, James Newton Howard, Danny Elfman, Michael Convertino, Steve Porcaro, and John Frizzell in various recording studios around the world. He conducted a film score for James Newton Howard's 1995 film Restoration in the famed studio, Air Lyndhurst in Hampstead, London. He also conducted James Newton Howard's score for the film Outbreak at Todd-AO Scoring Stage and other studios such as George Lucas’ Skywalker Ranch, TTG Studios, Sony Studios, 20th Century Fox, and Warner Bros.

Personal life

Kane married eight times. His first marriage, in 1948, was to the dancer Joy Holly. He met Holly while touring with Harry Jarkey at the Wenona Beach Casino at Bay City, Michigan. The couple separated in 1950 and divorced on August 2, 1951.

Kane's second marriage was to Jinx Clark, a fellow cast member and star of Holiday on Ice. They married in 1951 after the European Holiday on Ice Tour. After Kane returned from the army with an honorable medical discharge in 1953, their marriage ended and they were divorced on May 19, 1954.

Kane's third marriage was to skater Jeanne Cheadle, a member of the cast of Holiday on Ice, in 1955. This was one of Kane's shortest marriages and lasted less than a year. The couple divorced on December 12, 1955.

Kane's fourth marriage was to another skater and cast member of Holiday on Ice, Sherry Wells in 1956. Kane had his first son, David born in 1957. The couple divorced on January 29, 1959. Wells remarried and changed David's last name to Russell. David Russell is a retired executive and basketball coach. Kane has two grandsons from David, Bryson Russell and Coleman Russell.

His fifth marriage was to singer and actress Jaye P. Morgan. Kane was Morgan's pianist and conductor during their marriage. They adopted Kane's second son, Paul Steven Kane in 1963. The couple divorced in 1966.

In 1967, he married his sixth wife, Sara Jane Tallman Grusin, a studio singer in Los Angeles. Kane and Grusin had a son, Adam Kane, born in 1968. Adam is a film director in the Hollywood film studios.
Kane and Grusin divorced on September 15, 1970, after three years of marriage.

Kane met his seventh wife, Carol Faith, through his friend, Charles Fox, while scoring at Warner Brothers. Faith was Fox's agent. They married in 1976 and divorced on June 4, 1979.

In 1981, Kane married JoAnn Johnson, a music copyist. They had been married more than thirty-six years and resided on Whidbey Island in Washington state.

Kane died on June 21, 2022, at his home in Whidbey Island at the age of 93.

Awards and honors

In 1976, Kane was nominated for a Grammy Award along with Ralph Grierson for a two-piano Gershwin Album, '''S Wonderful on Angel Records. He was given a BMI Sterling Circle Award for 25 years affiliation in 1993. In 1998, he was inducted into the Columbus Senior Musicians Hall of Fame in Columbus, Ohio.

Kane also received seven BMI TV Music Awards for his television work:

Filmography

Television

Film

As Composer

As Conductor

As Pianist

Discography

See also
 List of film score composers
 List of keyboardists
 List of music arrangers

References

External links 
 

1929 births
2022 deaths
American male conductors (music)
American television composers
American film score composers
American male film score composers
American jazz pianists
American male pianists
American jazz organists
American male organists
American jazz keyboardists
American music arrangers
American session musicians
20th-century American composers
20th-century American pianists
20th-century American keyboardists
20th-century organists
American people of Russian-Jewish descent
People from Columbus, Ohio
Songwriters from Ohio
Musicians from Columbus, Ohio
Writers from Columbus, Ohio
Jazz musicians from Ohio
Classical musicians from Ohio
20th-century American conductors (music)
21st-century American conductors (music)
21st-century American pianists
21st-century organists
21st-century American keyboardists
20th-century American male musicians
21st-century American male musicians
American male jazz musicians
American people of Belarusian descent
American male songwriters